Hally is both a surname and a given name. Notable people with the name include:

Surname 
David Hally (born 1940), American archaeologist 
Janice Hally (born 1959), Scottish playwright and screenwriter
Patrick Hally (1866–1938), New Zealand politician
Philip Hally, Royal Navy officer

Given name 
Hally Fitch (born 1900), American archaeologist
Hally Pancer (born 1961), American photographer
Hally Jolivette Sax (1884-1979), American botanist
Hally Wood (1922–1989), American musician and singer